QuantZ is a puzzle and strategy game released by publisher and developer Gamerizon, a small company out of Montreal, on September 3, 2009. The object of the game is to shoot differently colored marbles one at a time at a cube with other colored marbles on it. If a combination of three marbles of the same color or more is formed, those marbles will disappear, similar to Collapse.

Gameplay
QuantZ has three game modes, Strategy, Action, and Puzzle.

Reception
 QuantZ received an 8.2 from GameZebo, which told players-to-be to "prepare for many hours of marble-bursting fun."
 Testfreaks gave QuantZ a score of 9.0 out of 10.0 
 Metacritic assigned a metascore of 67 to QuantZ, based on different reviews.

References

External links
 testfreaks.com
 Gamerizon Quantz Plug

Strategy video games